Ludlam may refer to:

Places
Mother Ludlam's Cave, Surrey, England
Ludlam Road, a street in Miami, Florida
Ludlam Island, an island in New Jersey
Ludlam's Beach Light, a lighthouse in Sea Isle City, New Jersey

Other uses
Ludlam (surname)

See also
Ludlum (disambiguation)